ADP-ribosylation factor-binding protein GGA1 is a protein that in humans is encoded by the GGA1 gene.

This gene encodes a member of the Golgi-localized, gamma adaptin ear-containing, ARF-binding (GGA) protein family. Members of this family are ubiquitous coat proteins that regulate the trafficking of proteins between the trans-Golgi network and the lysosome. These proteins share an amino-terminal VHS domain which mediates sorting of the mannose 6-phosphate receptors at the trans-Golgi network. They also contain a carboxy-terminal region with homology to the ear domain of gamma-adaptins. Multiple alternatively spliced transcript variants encoding different isoforms have been found for this gene.

Interactions
GGA1 has been shown to interact with Sortilin 1, BACE2, RABEP1 and ARF3.

References

Further reading